Fabrik Heeder is a theatre in Krefeld, North Rhine-Westphalia, Germany. It is a former factory building, originally constructed in 1906, and has been in use for cultural activities since 1989.

Buildings and structures in Krefeld
Theatres in North Rhine-Westphalia